Indian Creek is a stream in Humboldt County, Iowa, in the United States. It is a tributary of the Des Moines River.

Indian Creek was named after the Native Americans who once used the creek as their camping ground.

See also
List of rivers of Iowa

References

Rivers of Humboldt County, Iowa
Rivers of Iowa